The 1922 Detroit Titans football team represented the University of Detroit as an independent during the 1922 college football season. In its fifth year under head coach James F. Duffy, Detroit compiled a 7–2–1 record and outscored its opponents by a combined total of 116 to 54.  In addition to Duffy, the coaching staff included "Bingo" Brown (backfield coach), Pat Dwyer (line coach), and Harry Crowley (trainer).

The team played its home games at the new University of Detroit Stadium, built in 1922 at Livernois Avenue and Six Mile Road. The stadium was commonly known in 1922 as Dinan Field.

Quarterback Arthur P. "Patsy" McKenna was the team captain. Tackle Gus Sonnenberg, who went on to play eight seasons in the National Football League, was also a member of the team.

Schedule

References

External links
 1922 University of Detroit football programs

Detroit
Detroit Titans football seasons
Detroit Titans football
Detroit Titans football